Leinster Lightning was formed in 2013 and became a first-class team in 2017. They played their inaugural first-class match in the 2017 Inter-Provincial Championship against Northern Knights. Leinster Lightning have won the Interprovincial Championship five times, and once with first-class status. In total, 21 players have appeared in first-class cricket for Leinster Lightning, with five players having played in 11 out of 12 first-class fixtures played by Leinster Lightning.

Jack Tector is Leinster Lightning's leading run-scorer in first-class cricket, aggregating 527 runs. Four batsmen have scored a century for Leinster Lightning in the format: Ed Joyce, John Anderson, Andrew Balbirnie and Simi Singh. Joyce's score of 167 not out, scored in 2017 against Northern Knights is the highest score by a Leinster Lightning batsman, and Joyce also has the teams best batting average: 63.50. Among the bowlers, George Dockrell has taken more wickets than any other, claiming 36 – eight wickets more than that of the second most prolific bowler, Peter Chase. Dockrell also has the best bowling figures in an innings: he claimed six wickets against Northern Knights in a 2017 match, while conceding 29 runs. Lorcan Tucker has kept wicket in 11 out of 12 of Leinster Lightning's first-class matches, taking 24 catches and effecting 4 stumpings.  Balbirnie has claimed the highest number of catches among fielders, taking 11.

Players are initially listed in order of appearance; where players made their debut in the same match, they are initially listed by batting order.

Key

List of first-class cricketers

See also
List of Leinster Lightning List A players
List of Leinster Lightning Twenty20 players
List of Irish first-class cricketers

References

Leinster Lightning
Cricketers, first class